Ishtori Haparchi (1280-1355), also Estori Haparchi and Ashtori ha-Parhi is the pen name of the 14th-century Jewish physician, geographer, and traveller, Isaac HaKohen Ben Moses.

Pen name
HaParchi is commonly known by the title Kaftor va-Ferach taken from the name of his work, the expression being additionally a pun on his surname.

Ish Tori, as he refers to himself in his book, may mean "Man of Tours", the capital of the medieval French county of Touraine, though according to other opinions "Ishtori" was simply his personal name, a single word.

Biography
Ishtori Haparchi was born in Provence in 1280. Haparchi was descended from a line of sages and rabbis of fame. His father was Rabbi Moshe HaParhi, a distinguished Talmudical scholar. His grandfather was Rabbi Nathan of Trinquetaille, author of Shaar HiTefisa. His great-grandfather was Meir ben Isaac of Carcassonne, author of the Sefer ha-'Ezer.

When the Jews were expelled from France in 1306, he travelled to Spain and Egypt, and then settled in Palestine under the Mamluk Sultanate. He worked as a physician in Bet She'an, where he died in 1355.

Writings
In 1306, while in Barcelona, Ishtori Haparchi made a Hebrew translation of the Latin Tabula antidotarii of Armengaud Blaise.

Ishtori Haparchi was the author of the first Hebrew book on the geography of the Land of Israel, Sefer Kaftor va-Ferach, literally "Book of Bulb and Flower", or "Knob and Flower," written in 1322 in the Land of Israel and published in Venice in 1549. In the context of the book it refers to the agrarian laws practised by the nation of Israel. Haparchi lists the names of towns and villages in the Land of Israel and discusses the topography of the land based on first-hand visits to the sites. He describes its fruits and vegetables, and draws upon earlier rabbinic commentaries, such as the commentary compiled by Rabbi Isaac ben Melchizedek of Siponto. 

Modern scholarship relies heavily upon the 180 ancient sites he identified and described in relation to other sites, among them Usha, al-Midya and Battir.

Editions

References

1280 births
1355 deaths
Jewish explorers
French topographers
Holy Land travellers
14th-century French rabbis
14th-century French physicians
French people of Spanish-Jewish descent
Medieval Jewish physicians of France
Jewish refugees
Medieval Jewish travel writers
14th-century rabbis from the Mamluk Sultanate
Kohanim writers of Rabbinic literature
People from Northern District (Israel)
People from Beit She'an
Jewish agrarian laws
14th-century travelers